Pain Bazyar (also Romanized as Pā’īn Bazyār, Pā’īn Bazeyār, Pā’īn Bazīār, and Pā’īn Bāzīār; also known as Bāzyār-e Pā’īn) is a village in Lalehabad Rural District, Lalehabad District, Babol County, Mazandaran Province, Iran. At the 2006 census, its population was 1,345, in 350 families.

References 

Populated places in Babol County